Heinz Bachmann (born 1924) is a mathematician who worked at the Eidgenössische Sternwarte (federal observatory) in Zürich. He introduced the Bachmann–Howard ordinal and ordinal collapsing functions.

References

 

20th-century Swiss mathematicians
Set theorists
1924 births
Possibly living people